The 2022 Harvard Crimson men's volleyball team represents Harvard University in the 2022 NCAA Division I & II men's volleyball season. The Crimson, led by 12th year head coach Brian Baise, play their home games at Malkin Athletic Center. The Crimson are members of the EIVA and return to play after missing the 2021 season due to the corona virus cancelled Ivy League seasons. They were picked to finish sixth in the EIVA preseason poll.

Season highlights
Will be filled in as the season progresses.

Roster

Schedule
TV/Internet Streaming information:
All home games will be streamed on ESPN+. Most road games will also be streamed by the schools streaming service.

 *-Indicates conference match.
 Times listed are Eastern Time Zone.

Announcers for televised games
UC Irvine: Rob Espero & Charlie Brande
UC San Diego: Bryan Fenley & Ricci Luyties
Long Beach State: Matt Brown & Tyler Kulakowski
Queens: Ben Altsher & Justin Gallanty
King: Ben Altsher & Eric Gallanty
Purdue Fort Wayne: Craig White & Matt Corsetti
Penn State: Dana Grey & Ben Altsher
St. Francis: Dana Grey & Eric Gallanty
St. Francis Brooklyn: Craig White & Dana Grey
NJIT: Dylan Hornblum
Princeton: Ben Altsher
Princeton: Ben Altsher
Grand Canyon: Diana Johnson & Amanda Roach
Grand Canyon: Diana Johnson & Houston Boe
Sacred Heart: Brendan Picozzi
Sacred Heart: Luis Sanchez & Justin Gallanty
Penn State: Austin Groft & Thomas English
St. Francis: Matt Manz & Sophie Rice
St. Francis Brooklyn: Marc Ernay
NJIT: Ira Thor 
Charleston (WV): Ben Altsher
Charleston (WV): Ben Altsher & Dylan Hornblum
George Mason: Josh Yorkshire & Aylene Ilkson
George Mason: Tyler Byrum
NJIT: Matt Scalzo & Alex Rocco

References

2022 in sports in Massachusetts
2022 NCAA Division I & II men's volleyball season
Harvard